The Sunseeker Duo is a twin seat all-electric solar-recharged powered aircraft. Designed by Eric Scott Raymond, the plane can take off and achieve enough height for the motor to be switched off and follow thermals like a glider (sailplane), allowing the batteries to be recharged through the solar cells on the wings. Still in testing phase, the company, Solar Flight, does not provide information on the range.

Development
The Sunseeker Duo is a high aspect ratio side-by-side seat composite construction high-wing aircraft with a T-tail arrangement with a single electric motor mounted in the tailfin (vertical stabilizer) driving a forward mounted propeller. The first all-solar power generated flight was performed near Milan, Italy with company owners Eric Scott Raymond and Irena Raymond. 1510 solar cells capable of generating up to 5 kilowatts power the motor and battery pack.

Specifications (Sunseeker Duo)

See also

Notes

References

External links
Company website

Electric aircraft